Paul Bryan Crook (born ) is a former English professional rugby league footballer who last played for Oldham (Heritage № 1386) in Betfred League 1. In Oct 2019 he was appointed to coach the St Helens R.F.C. reserves team.

Crook signed for Whitehaven in October 2016 after captaining Rochdale to winning automatic promotion to the Championship with a 22-24 victory in the Grand Final against Toulouse in September 2016. Crook was also named League Express Player of the Year for Championship 1 in 2016. The  is a former Widnes Super League player and Great Britain Under-18s captain.

Background
Crook was born in Whiston Hospital, Knowsley, Merseyside, England.

Crook attended Parr Community High School from 1997–2002 and then went on to the Carmel College in St. Helens. He also went on to Edge Hill University, earning a sports and exercise science degree and has since become a qualified teacher of physical education. He now teaches at Hope Academy.

Career
Crook made his Super League début for Widnes in 2005 against London Broncos after progressing through the academy ranks at St. Helens. He went on to make 14 appearances that season under the New Zealand former international coach Frank Endacott. Since leaving Widnes in 2007, Crook has had spells at Doncaster and Swinton Lions before signing for Rochdale Hornets in 2010. Crook became a firm fans favourite over the next 7 seasons earning him the nickname 'The Ginger General' from the Rochdale Hornets supporters. Crook played 166 times for Rochdale Hornets, and after scoring 1499 points became the all-time top points scorer for the club, a record which had stood for 82 years. Crook enjoyed a successful time at Rochdale Hornets earning two league promotions in 2013 and 2016. In October 2016, Crook signed for Whitehaven.

Crook signed for Oldham in October 2017.

References

External links 

Oldham profile
(archived by archive.is) profile at hornetsrugbyleague.co.uk
 Paul Crook's Twitter page

1986 births
Living people
Doncaster R.L.F.C. players
English rugby league coaches
English rugby league players
Oldham R.L.F.C. players
People from Whiston, Merseyside
Rochdale Hornets captains
Rochdale Hornets players
Rugby league five-eighths
Rugby league hookers
Rugby league players from St Helens, Merseyside
Swinton Lions players
Whitehaven R.L.F.C. players
Widnes Vikings players